Walter Hamlet Johnson (21 November 1917 – 12 April 2003) was a British Labour Party politician.

Early life
Johnson was born in Hertford.

Political career
Before being elected, Johnson stood several times for Parliament without success. In the 1955 General Election he fought Bristol West, but was defeated by the Conservative Cabinet Minister Walter Mockton. He contested South Bedfordshire in 1959, and a by-election at Acton in 1968 that was one of three Labour seats lost that day (in Johnson's case to the future Cabinet Minister Kenneth Baker).

Following the retirement of Philip Noel-Baker as the Member of Parliament, Johnson retained Derby South at the 1970 general election for the Labour Party, and was an assistant government whip from 1974 to 1975. He stood down as an MP at the 1983, after which he was succeeded by Margaret Beckett.

Johnson was partly funded by the Transport Salaried Staffs' Association. He was treasurer of that Association from 1965 to 1977.

Death
He died in Haywards Heath, aged 85.

References

Times Guide to the House of Commons 1979

External links
 

1917 births
2003 deaths
Labour Party (UK) MPs for English constituencies
Members of the Parliament of the United Kingdom for constituencies in Derbyshire
Presidents of the Transport Salaried Staffs' Association
UK MPs 1970–1974
UK MPs 1974
UK MPs 1974–1979
UK MPs 1979–1983
People from Hertford
Transport Salaried Staffs' Association-sponsored MPs